The North Central Correctional Institution  is a minimum- and medium-security prison for men located in Marion, Marion County, Ohio, operated by Management and Training Corporation under contract with the Ohio Department of Rehabilitation and Correction.  

The facility first opened in 1994 and has a working population of 2893 state inmates.  The facility is owned by the state, and under MTC management since the end of 2011.

Notable inmates
 Robert Cordell, pleaded guilty to the murder of Kathleen Cordell, Frank Carnevale, and Rita Bushman.

References

Prisons in Ohio
Buildings and structures in Marion, Ohio
Management and Training Corporation
1994 establishments in Ohio